Harry J. Lonsdale (born Henry Gittus Lonsdale; 6 December 1862 – 8 February 1939) was a British born actor stage and silent film actor. He played leading parts. and married stage actress Alice Lonnon and then divorced.

Lonsdale was born in Worcester, and died in Derby. The National Portrait Gallery has a photograph of him in costume as the Marquis de Corneville in Les Cloches de Corneville from 1890.

Lonsdale had roles in several Colin Campbell directed films for Selig.

Selected filmography
Tommy's Atonement (1913)
The Ex-Convict's Plunge (1913)
A Change of Administration (1913)
The Rosary (1915)
Sweet Alyssum (1915)
The Ne'er-Do-Well (1916)
The Garden of Allah (1916)
His Brothers Keeper (1916)
Who Shall Take My Life? (1917)
Beware of Strangers (1917)
Little Orphant Annie (1918)
The City of Purple Dreams
The Illustrious Prince (1919)
The Shepherd of the Hills (1919)
 Where Men Are Men (1921)
 The Fighting Guide (1922)
 The Call of Home (1922)
The Great Night (1922)
 Thelma (1922)
Big Dan (1923)
The Vagabond Trail (1924)
The Last of the Duanes (1924)
 Brand of Cowardice (1925)
Her Husband's Secret (1925)

References

External links

1862 births
1939 deaths
English male stage actors
English male silent film actors
19th-century British male actors
20th-century British male actors
British expatriate male actors in the United States
Actors from Worcester, England